Goldau is a town in the community of Arth, canton of Schwyz, Switzerland. It lies between   the Rigi and Rossberg mountains, and between lakes Zug and Lauerz. 
Well known attractions include the Natur- und Tierpark Goldau and the Arth-Goldau valley station of the Arth-Rigi Bahn connecting to the Rigi mountain.

Goldau is primarily known in Switzerland for its historic landslide, the "Goldau landslide" (Goldauer Bergsturz) of 1806 which killed 457 people. It is also known for its importance for the Swiss railways network, with Arth-Goldau station forming the intersection between the  Gotthard, Lucerne, Zug–Zürich and Pfäffikon lines.

Goldau landslide

There were numerous historical landslides in Goldau, with a major event, more significant than the 1806 landslide, dated to the 14th century.
The toponym itself, first recorded in 1353, refers to the remnants of these landslides, from a dialectal gol, goleten "gravel, rubble, debris".

On September 2, 1806 heavy rains triggered a landslide from the Rossberg which destroyed Goldau and the adjacent villages of Buosingen, Röthen and Lauerz.

Part of the mass hit Lake Lauerz (which had been created by an even larger landslide in the 14th century), and the resulting tsunami-like displacement wave caused more devastation towards Seewen. It resulted in the confirmed death of 457 people.

The disaster inspired the epic poem Goldau by American writer John Neal in 1818. A museum outside the Natur- und Tierpark exhibits findings and photos of the event.

Sport
SC Goldau is the city's football club.

References

External links
Arth-Online
Landslide Museum
Rigi area website

Villages in the canton of Schwyz
Landslides in Switzerland
Landslides in 1806
1806 disestablishments in Europe
19th-century disasters in Switzerland
1806 natural disasters
1806 disasters in Europe